Isaac Oliseh (born 3 August 1993) is a Nigerian footballer who plays as a midfielder for Jomala IK in Finland.

External links
 
 Isaac Oliseh profile at Dansk Fodbold

1993 births
Living people
Nigerian footballers
FC Midtjylland players
Thisted FC players
Danish Superliga players
Nigerian expatriate footballers
Expatriate men's footballers in Denmark
Expatriate footballers in Finland
Association football midfielders